Tryphon Samaras (Greek: Τρύφωνας Σαμαράς) is a Greek hairdresser and television personality.

Youthful years 
He was born in Athens, and grew up in Agios Dimitrios, Attica. His parents are Charalambos and Voula Samara.

Career and important personal moments 
After graduating from high school, he began his career as a hairdresser in the early 1990s. In 1997, he founded his own business in the centre of Athens. She has been responsible for the hair care of important names in the global television and art industry (Naomi Campbell, Caitlyn Jenner, Kate Moss, Linda Evangelista, Monica Bellucci, Natalia Vodyanova, Carla Bruni, etc. ), as well as in the domestic industry. At the same time, he is the author of two books and has been publishing his own diary for years.

Since the early 2010s, Tryphon Samaras, after becoming known as a hairdresser, has become a TV personality, taking part in many TV shows, reality shows, TV shows and performances.

Starting from friendly appearances on Black Out and Wipe Out in the early 2010s, Tryphon became known and loved by the Greek audience for his humor and his personality. She also participated in Dancing with the Stars in 2011 where she failed to place last. Then in the same year he participated in the show The Great Laughter School where he gives an exclusive but very revealing interview. Then towards the fall of 2011 came the broadcast station in the career of Fab 5.

Filmography

Television

Videography

Videos

References 

Living people
Greek artists
Hairdressing
Greek businesspeople
Year of birth missing (living people)
Mass media people from Athens